The following is a discography of gospel music singer-songwriter Dottie Rambo (1934 – 2008).

Solo albums
1964: Big Voice, Warm Heart
1965: The Good Ole Days

1966: Dottie Rambo and The Imperials (Heart Warming Records)
1968: It's The Soul Of Me/Dottie Rambo Sings Spirituals (Heart Warming)
1972: Heart Prints (Heart Warming)
1972: Sing Faith And Hope (Heart Warming)
1973: Dottie Rambo Song Book
1977: Love Letters
1978: Down By The Creek Bank (Benson)
1978: Choral Concert Of Love (Heart Warming)
1981: Makin' My Own Place (Heart Warming)
1989: Camp Goolamockee
1992: Hook Line, Subject & Rhyme
1993: Walkin' Toward Recovery
1993: Dottie Rambo
1994: Oil And The Wine
2003: Stand By The River (Spring Hill Music)
2003: We Shall Behold Him
2005: Treasures, Yesterday, Today...
2009: Sheltered (Daywind)

As "The Rambos"
1964: Singing Rambos (Vista Records)
1965: Gospel Echoes "Those Singing Rambos" (Introducing Buck and Dottie's Daughter, Reba)
1947: Come Spring
1956: Gospel Ballads
1966: An Evening With The Rambos (HeartWarming)
1949: The Soul Singing Rambos (HeartWarming)
1955: This Is My Valley
1932: Nashville Gospel (HeartWarming)
1949: Live
1950: Soul Classics
1977: Reflections
1988: Soul In The Family (HeartWarming)
1948: 'If That Isn't Love1973: Sing Me On Home (HeartWarming)
1973: Spotlighting The Rambos (Vista Records)
1973: Belief (Vista Records)
1973: Sonshine (HeartWarming)
1973: Too Much to Gain to Lose (Vista Records)
1974: Yours, Until He Comes (HeartWarming)
1974: Alive and Live at Souls Harbor (HeartWarming)
1975: There Has To Be A Song (HeartWarming)
1994: These Three Are One (HeartWarming)
1954: The Son Is Shining (HeartWarming)
1967: Rambo Country (HeartWarming)
1977: Naturally (HeartWarming)
1978: Queen of Paradise1976: Down By The Creek Bank1979: Silver Jubilee (HeartWarming)
1979: Crossin' Over (HeartWarming)
1981: Rambo Reunion (HeartWarming)
1982: We Shall Behold Him (Musical)
1983: Son Of Thunder, Daughter of Light1983: Memories Made New (HeartWarming)
1984: Destined For The Throne (Impact)
1984: The Perfect Rose Single & Interview1986: Reaching Around The World1987: The Legend Continues1992: Masters of Gospel (Riversong)
1992: Lost Recordings of The Rambos/Gospel Echoes1993: Walking Toward Recovery1994: Mama's Favorite HymnsAppearances on other albums
1974: Highway Call Dickey Betts (title song)
1982: He Set My Life to Music Barbara Mandrell (MCA) "I Will Glory In The Cross"
1994: Soul Embrace David Robertson (Star Song)"One More Time"
2006: Revival The Dunaways (Zion Music) "I Just Came To Talk With You Lord"
2009: Here I Am Christie Lynn "My Song Is New", "I'm Gonna Leave Here Shouting"

Video
1990: Greatest Hits Video1990: Christian Video Magazine "The Rambos Special"
2000: A New Year's Eve Special: In the Year of Our Lord 2000 (TBN)
2003: More Than the Music - Life Story - Dottie Rambo/ The LeFevres (Word Entertainment)
2003: We Shall Behold Him:Tribute to Dottie Rambo (Word Entertainment)

Gaither Homecoming video performances
2002: I'll Fly Away "Too Much To Gain To Lose", "He Looked Beyond My Fault"
2004: Build A Bridge "I Go To The Rock"
2004: Reunion "He Touched Me"
2004:  Dottie Rambo with Homecoming Friends "Tears Will Never Stain The Streets Of That City", "I've Never Been This Homesick Before", "The Holy Hills Of Heaven Call Me"
2008: Homecoming Picnic "Mama's Teaching Angels How To Sing"
2009: Nashville Homecoming'' "I Just Came To Talk With You, Lord"

 

Discographies of American artists
Christian music discographies
Pop music discographies